Syriana is the original soundtrack, on the RCA Victor label, of the 2005 Academy Award- and Golden Globe-winning film Syriana starring Kayvan Novak, Matt Damon, George Clooney (who won the Academy Award for Best Supporting Actor for his role as "Bob Barnes" in this film), Christopher Plummer, Jeffrey Wright and Chris Cooper. The original score and songs were composed by Alexandre Desplat.

Desplat's score was nominated for the Golden Globe Award for Best Original Score.

Track listing 
 Syriana 2:28
 Driving In Geneva 2:45
 Fields Of Oil 2:10
 The Commute 4:22
 Beirut Taxi 3:46
 Something Really Cool 1:38
 Syriana (Piano Solo) 3:18
 I'll Walk Around 2:37
 Access Denied 2:51
 Electricity 3:59
 Falcons 0:57
 The Abduction 4:17
 Tortured 2:17
 Take the Target Out 1:23
 Truce 1:42
 Mirage 1:39
 Fathers and Sons 3:38

Thriller film soundtracks
2005 soundtrack albums
RCA Victor soundtracks
Alexandre Desplat soundtracks